The canton of Sin-le-Noble is an administrative division of the Nord department, northern France. It was created at the French canton reorganisation which came into effect in March 2015. Its seat is in Sin-le-Noble.

It consists of the following communes:

Bruille-lez-Marchiennes
Erre
Fenain
Hornaing
Lallaing
Marchiennes
Pecquencourt
Rieulay
Sin-le-Noble
Somain
Tilloy-lez-Marchiennes
Vred
Wandignies-Hamage
Warlaing
Waziers

References

Cantons of Nord (French department)